Akiko is a 1961 Italian comedy film written and directed by Luigi Filippo D'Amico.

Plot 
In Rome, Mrs. Ottavia Colasanto has not had news of her husband since he went to Japan eighteen years ago. She is considered practically a widow. One day, a very beautiful young Japanese girl arrives. She notifies the Colasanto family that she is the biological daughter of Ottavia's (presumably) deceased husband.

Cast 
Akiko Wakabayashi as Akiko
Pierre Brice as Duilio
Marisa Merlini as Ottavia Colasanto
Memmo Carotenuto as Armando Piffero 
 as Anita Colasanto 
Valeria Fabrizi as Tosca
Andrea Checchi as Sor Egisto
Marcello Paolini as  Serse Colasanto
Giacomo Furia as  Peppe, aka "Er Campanaro" 
Giuseppe Chinnici as the commissioner
 as the referee in the ring
Paolo Ferrari as  "Terzo Braccio"
Paolo Panelli as  Felice
Carlo Taranto
 as little boy asking for a cigarette
 
Ettore Zamperini

References

External links

1961 films
Italian comedy films
1961 comedy films
Films directed by Luigi Filippo D'Amico
Films set in Rome
Films shot in Rome
1960s Italian films
1960s Italian-language films